Cora Daniels is an African-American author who has written on issues of African-American culture. She is now teaching writing and reporting at New York University's Arthur L. Carter Journalism Institute.

Books
Black Power Inc.
Ghettonation: A Journey into the Land of the Bling and The Home of the Shameless.

References

External links
Biography at the Ghettonation Blog
Official Website
Cora Daniels discusses her book - March 2007

Year of birth missing (living people)
Living people
African-American writers
21st-century African-American people